The Australian College of Midwives (ACM) is a professional organisation representing midwives and midwifery policy in Australia.

The Australian College of Midwives (ACM) was founded nationally in 1984, when midwifery associations in a number of states and territories came together to create a national body for Australian midwives.

The ACM is a federated body consisting of eight separate State and Territory Branches that make up the National College.  The national office is based in Canberra, Australia.

The ACM is governed by a nine member board of directors, an eight member ACM Council consisting of an elected member from each state or territory, and a head office consisting of CEO Helen White and Principal Midwifery Officer (TBA) .

References

Medical and health organisations based in Australia
Midwifery organizations
National Rural Health Alliance organisations
Midwifery in Australia